Sky blue is a shade of light blue comparable to that of a clear daytime sky. The term (as "sky blew") is attested from 1681. A 1585 translation of Nicolas de Nicolay's 1576  includes "the tulbant [turban] of the merchant must be skie coloured".

Displayed at right is the web colour sky blue.

Variations

Celeste

Celeste is the colloquial name for the pale turquoise blue colour. The same word, meaning "of the sky", is used in Spanish, Portuguese and Italian for the colour. In English, this colour may also be referred to as Italian sky blue.

Bleu celeste ("sky blue") is a rarely occurring tincture in heraldry (not being one of the seven main colours or metals or the three "staynard colours").  This tincture is sometimes also called ciel or simply celeste.  It is depicted in a lighter shade than the range of shades of the more traditional tincture azure, which is the standard blue used in heraldry.

Gradations
The Italian Wikipedia cites  by S.Fantetti and C.Petracchi and describes multiple variants of celeste as shown below, plus details as defined in the infobox above.

Light sky blue

Displayed at right is the web colour light sky blue.  It is close in shade to baby blue.

Medium sky blue

Displayed at right is the colour medium sky blue. This is the colour that is called sky blue in Crayola crayons. This colour was formulated by Crayola in 1958.

"Sky blue" appears in the 32, 48, 64, 96 and 120 packs of crayons.

Vivid sky blue

Displayed at right is the colour vivid sky blue.

Deep sky blue

Deep sky blue is an azure-cyan colour associated with deep shade of sky blue.

Deep sky blue is a web colour.

This is the colour on the colour wheel (RGB/HSV colour wheel) halfway between azure and cyan.

The colour name deep sky blue came into use with the formulization of the X11 colour names over 1985–1989. 

The normalized colour coordinates for deep sky blue are identical to Capri, which first came into use as a colour name in English in 1920.

French sky blue

At right is displayed the colour French sky blue, which is the tone of sky blue that is called sky blue (bleu ciel) in the Pourpre.com colour list, a colour list widely popular in France.

Spanish sky blue

Juan Carlos Sanz, a colour dictionary published in 2005 that is widely popular in the Hispanophone realm.

Dark sky blue

Displayed at right is the colour dark sky blue.

This is the colour called sky blue in Pantone.

The source of this colour is the "Pantone Textile Paper eXtended (TPX)" colour list, color #14-4318 TPX—Sky Blue.

In culture
Sports
Argentina: Following the colours of the flag of Argentina, in which sky blue (celeste in Spanish) is the predominant colour, many Argentine sport teams feature the colour, including Racing Club de Avellaneda, Racing de Córdoba, Club Atlético Temperley, Atlético de Rafaela, Villa San Carlos, Gimnasia y Tiro de Salta, and Gimnasia y Esgrima de Concepción del Uruguay. In addition, the Argentina national football team is known as the  due to the white-and-sky blue striping on their jerseys. This colour scheme is featured in other prominent national squads in popular sports such as rugby, field hockey, polo or volleyball.
Australia: Sky blue is the main colour of the Australian rugby league team, New South Wales Blues, as it is the official colour of the state they represent.
Italy: Celeste is the main colour of the football team S.S. Lazio of Rome, and one of the two main colours (the other being dark blue) of the football team Calcio Lecco 1912 of Lecco.
United Kingdom: Manchester City adopted sky blue as the main colour of their home jersey in 1894 and have used that ever since then.
Uruguay: The Uruguay national football team has worn a sky blue jersey since 1910, after Uruguayan club team River Plate F.C. wore sky blue while defeating contemporary Argentine powerhouse Alumni Athletic Club. The national team is nicknamed La Celeste. As in Argentina, a number of Uruguayan club teams use sky blue in their uniforms, such as C.A. Cerro, Montevideo City Torque, Club Oriental de Football, and Rocha F.C.

See also
 Air Force blue
 Azure
 Bleu celeste (in heraldry)
 List of colours
 Marian blue
 Shades of blue
 RAL 5015 Sky blue

References

Shades of azure